Captain Ronald Roscoe Thornely  (10 July 1889 – 21 August 1984) was an English World War I flying ace. He was credited with nine aerial victories while flying for the Royal Naval Air Service.

Early life
Thornely was born in Merton Hall, Cambridge, England, the son of Thomas Thornely (1855–1949), a historian, poet and Fellow of Trinity Hall, Cambridge, and his wife Mabel Martha Thornely.

Military service
Thornely was commissioned as a temporary sub-lieutenant in the Royal Naval Volunteer Reserve on 12 December 1914. He served in the Royal Naval Armoured Car Division during the Gallipoli campaign. In May 1916, he transferred to the Royal Naval Air Service, being confirmed as a flight sub-lieutenant on 5 May, and granted Royal Aero Club Aviator's Certificate No. 3290 after soloing a Maurice Farman biplane at the Royal Naval Air Station, Chingford, on 29 July 1916.

He joined No. 8 Squadron RNAS in March 1917, gaining his first aerial victory on 4 June, and then two more before being promoted to flight lieutenant on 30 June. Two more victories followed in July, three in August, and his ninth and last on 11 September.

His award of the Distinguished Service Cross was gazetted on 30 October 1917. His citation read:
Flight Lieutenant Ronald Roscoe Thornley, RNAS.
"For gallantry and skill in aerial combats, notably on the following occasions:On the 16th June, 1917, whilst on patrol, he attacked a two-seater Aviatik, which fell to the ground, inside our lines.On the 15th August, 1917, he attacked an Albatross scout and shot it down out of control.On the 19th August, 1917, he attacked an Aviatik and drove it down out of control.On the 11th September, 1917, he engaged one of three enemy machines, firing about fifty rounds when quite close, apparently wounding the observer at once, and shortly afterwards the enemy machine fell out of control."

Thornley was promoted to the temporary rank of captain on 7 May 1918.

List of aerial victories

Post World War I
Thornely received a mention in dispatches "for distinguished service in war areas" on 1 January 1919, and was transferred to the unemployed list of the Royal Air Force on 1 March 1919.

On 29 April 1949 Ronald Roscoe Thornely was named as executor of the estates of his parents Thomas and Mabel Martha Thornely, who both died in January 1949.

Thornely died on 21 August 1984, and is buried at Putney Vale Cemetery, London.

Notes

References

Bibliography
 
 

1889 births
1984 deaths
People from Cambridge
Royal Naval Volunteer Reserve personnel of World War I
Royal Naval Air Service personnel of World War I
Royal Air Force personnel of World War I
British World War I flying aces
Recipients of the Distinguished Service Cross (United Kingdom)